62nd General Assembly of Nova Scotia was the assembly of the Nova Scotia House of Assembly that was determined in the 2013 Nova Scotia election. The assembly opened on October 24, 2013  and was dissolved April 30, 2017.

Seating plan

List of members

Membership changes in the 62nd Assembly

References

62
2013 establishments in Nova Scotia
2017 disestablishments in Nova Scotia
21st century in Nova Scotia